Omero Carmellini (28 January 1921 – 24 September 1997) was an Italian professional football player.

He played 3 games for A.S. Roma in the Serie A in the 1940/41 season. He died in Rome in September 1997 at the age of 56.

References

1921 births
1997 deaths
A.S. Roma players
Italian footballers
Rimini F.C. 1912 players
Serie A players
S.S. Alba-Audace Roma players
Association football forwards